Sant'Agata dei Goti is a church in Rome, Italy, dedicated to the martyr Agatha of Sicily. It is the diaconia assigned to Cardinal Raymond Leo Burke, patron of the Sovereign Military Order of Malta.  (It became pro hac vice a presbyteral title in 2021 when Cardinal Burke opted to become a cardinal priest.)

History
The church was built by Ricimer for the Goths c. 460. The Goths were Arians, so when Arianism was suppressed in Rome, the building was taken over by the Catholic Church, in 592 or 593, and reconsecrated by Pope Gregory the Great. It was restored in the 9th century, and a Benedictine monastery was founded next to it. The apse of the church collapsed in 1589, and it was partially rebuilt in 1633, without major changes to the building itself apart from the new apse. The small courtyard outside the church was laid out at this time. 

The church has been served by the Stigmatines since 1926. Their generalate is adjacent to it. It is the only Arian church that has been preserved in Rome.

Exterior

The Romanesque campanile was built in the 12th century. The façade was rebuilt by Francesco Ferrari in 1729. The relief above the door shows St. Agatha holding her severed breasts on a plate; her torturers severed her breasts when she refused to renounce her faith in Christ.

The entrance from Via Mazzarino opens on a 17th-century courtyard. From 1836 to 1926, it belonged to the Irish College. Cardinal Paul Cullen, a former Rector of the Irish College, modelled the church of the Holy Cross College in Clonliffe in Dublin on the plans of St Agatha's.

Interior

Although it was redecorated in the Baroque style and has some 19th-century additions, it is still possible to see traces of the 5th-century plan, which was a basilica with three naves. The granite columns separating the naves are ancient.

The fresco in the apse shows the Glory of St Agatha, made by Paolo Gismondi in the 17th century. A cherub bring the severed breasts of Agatha on a platter to the Virgin as a demonstration of her sacrifice. There is a 12th- or 13th-century canopy above the altar, reassembled and erected here in 1933. It has four columns of pavonazzetto marble, all decorated with Cosmatesque mosaic, and a temple roof. The former canopy was destroyed in 1589; fragments can be seen in the ceiling of the main chapel on the left-hand side.

The 15th-century Cosmatesque pavement in the middle of the nave has an unusual, but very nice, design. It is a very late example of the style. Cardinal Francesco Barberini paid for the wooden ceiling. The rectangular windows were installed in the 17th century at the request of the Cardinals Francesco and Antonio Barberini. By the altar of St Agatha is a large statue of the saint.

Ricimer, who was buried in the church, had a mosaic installed. This was unfortunately destroyed in 1589, when the apse collapsed. The Greek humanist John Lascaris (died 1535) is interred in the church and the heart of Daniel O'Connell, the 'Liberator' (died Genoa 1847), was buried here. The heart disappeared in vague circumstances during renovation work around 1925.

Liturgy
The feast of the Greek martyrs whose relics are preserved here is on 2 December. It is usually celebrated with an evening Mass with the liturgy of the Byzantine Catholic rite.

Other important feasts are that of St Agatha on 5 February and St Gaspar Bertoni, founder of the Stigmatines, on 12 June.

Titulars 
Pro illa vice, literally "for that turn", indicates a temporary appointment. In commendam indicates that a cardinal who holds one title is also granted oversight of another vacant title.

References

Sources
Lucinda Byatt, "Sant'Agata dei Goti on the Quirinal: An Early Sixteenth-Century Fulcrum for Politics and Learning under Cardinal Ridolfi,"  Conference: Early Modern Rome 1341-1667, University of California Rome, 13-15 May 2010
Burial of O'Connell's heart in Rome

460s establishments
17th-century Roman Catholic church buildings in Italy
18th-century Roman Catholic church buildings in Italy
Agata
5th-century churches
Ostrogothic art
Churches of Rome (rione Monti)